Aşağı Nüvədi (also, Ashagi Nuvadi, Ashagy Nyuvedi, and Nizhniye Nyuady) is a village and municipality in the Lankaran Rayon of Azerbaijan.  It has a population of 3,218.

References 

Populated places in Lankaran District